Rule 63 is an Internet meme that states that, as a rule, "for every given male character, there is a female version of that character" and vice versa. It is one of the "Rules of the Internet" that began in 2006 as a Netiquette guide on 4chan and were eventually expanded upon by including deliberately mocking rules, of which Rule 63 is an example. It began to see general use in fandom communities as a term to refer to both fan-made and official gender flips of existing fictional characters.

Origin 
Prior to the creation of Rule 63, gender flipping was popularized in video games in the 1990s by the finishing move of Darkstalkers character Demitri Maximoff, a vampire. Called the "Midnight Bliss", it involved tossing a rose at a character to transform them into a helpless maiden and completely drain them of life energy. This meant that female versions of all the game's male characters had to be created, as well as those of Street Fighter and SNK characters when SNK vs. Capcom included Maximoff. These female interpretations became popular and resulted in large amounts of fan art, as well as prompting art of gender-swaps of other male and female characters.

Rule 63 was created in mid-2007 as an addition to the humorous "Rules of the Internet", originally created around the end of 2006 on 4chan. It lists two statements:
 "for every given male character, there is a female version of that character", and
 "for every given female character, there is a male version of that character".
The primacy of the male to female transition contains an implied subtext that female to male gender flipping is less important.

The trope, originally seen primarily unofficially, later became more widely disseminated in popular culture, with critics stating that it had been "recognized by Hollywood".

Usage 
Rule 63 is commonly used as a term to refer to gender-swapped interpretations of existing characters in fanworks, such as fan art, fan fiction and cosplay, and it is particularly pervasive in the anime and manga community, where communities sprang up built around romantic gender-swap relationships. It also often overlaps with the creation of moe anthropomorphic female versions of non-human, male characters. A well-known example of this is Bowsette, a female version of the Mario antagonist Bowser that became one of the most popular Internet memes of 2018. However, it has also been used by critics to refer to official characters who are gender-swapped versions of older characters or fictional beings, such as Number Six from Battlestar Galactica being a "sexy female" version of a Cylon Centurion, and the female main cast of the 2016 reboot of Ghostbusters.

The creation of Rule 63 cosplays such as gender-swapped superheroes has been cited as popular amongst female cosplayers as giving them the ability to portray roles beyond socially approved gendered scripts. It is seen as empowering, allowing cosplayers to wear clothing and weapons usually not afforded to female characters. However, certain characters with inherent gender fluidity are said to work better than others. Such gender-bending cosplay, which allows the cosplayer to choose what behavior enhances the performance, can be contrasted with crossplay, which completely immerses the cosplayer in the codes of another gender.

Notable examples

In film and television 

 Adventure Time received a spin-off series entitled Fionna and Cake, based on the eponymous episode of the original show, which featured a gender-swapped Finn and Jake as main characters, as well as genderbent versions of other characters that later featured in other episodes.
The 2016 Ghostbusters reboot featured a cast of female leads that was called "proof of Rule 63", with similarities noted between each team member and one of the original male team members. It was called an official acknowledgement of what was formerly an unofficial, fan-driven phenomenon.
The 2022 DreamWorks The Bad Guys, had Mr. Tarantula's Gender Swapped to a Girl in the film.

In video games 

 In the Mario series, the fan-made Bowsette is a female version of the male antagonist Bowser, created through the use of the Super Crown, a power-up that imparts the appearance and abilities of Princess Peach on its user. Nintendo's official clarification is that the item is only usable by Toadette, and the creation of Bowsette is "technically impossible".
In Shovel Knight, a "Body Swap Mode" (originally called "Gender Swap") was added after it was funded as a Kickstarter goal, allowing the player to change the secondary sex characteristics of every major character in the game (and, independently, their pronouns) via the settings menu. The developers endeavored to maintain parity with the original character designs by only making their swapped version as gendered as the original, as well as matching their existing personality and gameplay.
 In the Zelda series, the character Linkle was created by Nintendo as an alternate-universe gender-swap of the typical main character, Link. However, she does not possess his powers, and is instead a normal girl who dual-wields a pair of crossbows. Made playable in Hyrule Warriors Legends, she was also modded into The Legend of Zelda: Breath of the Wild by a fan to replace Link. The character Sheik, who Princess Zelda has the ability to transform into in The Legend of Zelda: Ocarina of Time, has been called the most iconic example of female-to-male gender-swapping in gaming, although Sheik has both male and female characteristics.

See also 
 Rule 34
 Crossplay (cosplay)

References

External links

 Rules of the Internet 1000 Rules Of the Internet

Internet culture
Internet terminology
Internet memes introduced in 2007
Gender and entertainment
Gender fluidity